Stacey Totman is the former head coach of the Texas Tech Red Raiders women's golf team.

External links
Profile at Texas Tech Athletics
Texas Tech Women's Golf

Texas Tech Red Raiders women's golf coaches
Year of birth missing (living people)
Living people